Rolph Barnes (16 July 1904 – 6 October 1982) was a Canadian middle-distance runner. He competed in the men's 1500 metres at the 1924 Summer Olympics.

References

External links
 

1904 births
1982 deaths
Athletes (track and field) at the 1924 Summer Olympics
Canadian male middle-distance runners
Olympic track and field athletes of Canada
Athletes from Hamilton, Ontario